Anaikuppam  is a village in the Nannilam taluk of Tiruvarur district in Tamil Nadu, India.

Demographics 

As per the 2001 census, Anaikuppam had a population of 3,014 with 1,503 males and 1,511 females. The sex ratio was 1005. The literacy rate was 72.19.

References 

 

Villages in Tiruvarur district